Katrina Shankland (born August 4, 1987) is an American community organizer and Democratic politician.  She is a member of the Wisconsin State Assembly, representing the 71st Assembly district—based in Stevens Point and central Portage County.

Biography

Originally from Wittenberg, Wisconsin, Shankland graduated from Wittenberg-Birnamwood High School in 2005.  She went on to attend University of Wisconsin–Marathon County and Marquette University, before earning her bachelor's degree in political science and Latin American studies from University of Wisconsin-Madison in 2009.  She continued her education after joining the Assembly, and earned her master's degree in 2019 from University of Wisconsin-Stevens Point.

While working on her bachelor's degree, she was employed with Learning Enterprises International, a non-profit focused on promoting teaching through international programs.  After graduating from college, she was employed for several years as a coordinator for the Midwest Renewable Energy Association.  She also became involved as a community organizer for the Democratic Party of Wisconsin and was active for the campaign of Milwaukee Mayor Tom Barrett in the 2012 Wisconsin gubernatorial recall election.

In the midst of the recall election, Shankland entered the Democratic primary race for Wisconsin State Assembly in the 71st Assembly district.  The 71st district was being vacated by State Representative Louis Molepske, who was leaving the Assembly to run for district attorney instead.  The open seat in the Democratic-friendly 71st district ultimately attracted nine candidates.  Shankland narrowly prevailed with 27% of the vote in the crowded August primary, with a winning margin of only 44 votes.  In the general election, she faced fellow first-time candidate Patrick Testin, carrying 60% of the vote and taking the seat for the 2013–2014 term.  She was subsequently reelected without opposition in 2014, 2016, and 2018, and defeated a challenger in 2020 to win a fifth term.

Electoral history

Wisconsin Assembly

References

External links
 
 
 Representative Katrina Shankland at Wisconsin Legislature
 71st Assembly District map (2011–2021)
 Midwest Renewable Energy Association
 Learning Enterprises

Living people
People from Stevens Point, Wisconsin
University of Wisconsin–Madison College of Letters and Science alumni
Women state legislators in Wisconsin
1987 births
21st-century American politicians
21st-century American women politicians
People from Wittenberg, Wisconsin
People from Wausau, Wisconsin
Democratic Party members of the Wisconsin State Assembly